Andrew Ddungu Kambugu  is a Ugandan physician who serves as  The Sande-McKinnell Executive Director at Uganda Infectious Disease Institute and a Honorary Senior  lecturer at Makerere University College of Sciences. He is also an Adjunct Associate Professor at the University of Minnesota. In July 2020, he was appointed to the United Nations 2021 Food System Scientific Group.

Early life and education
Kambugu was born  on 22 February 1973 in Kampala, Uganda. He is a trained fellow in infectious diseases from University of Manitoba.

Career
Kambugu did his medical internship at Mulago National hospital in Kampala (1997–98) and has served as a Medical Officer of  Uganda Telecom (1998-1999), as a Medical Resident in the Department of Medicine at Makerere University Medical School (October 1998-November  2002), as a physician attending Ward 4B at Mulago Hospital (December 2002 - August 2005) as  Head of Preventative Care and Treatment Programme (2005-2012), as Head of Research Programme (May 2012- update) and in May 2013 he was appointed as The  Sande-McKinnell Executive Director at Infectious Disease Institute. Kambugu is  a Honorary Senior   lecturer in the Department of Medicine at Makerere University College of Health Sciences.  He has presented at Medical conferences inside and outside Uganda such as at Retroviruses and Opportunistic Infections, The International AIDS conference, The South Africa HIV Clinicians Society (2014, 2016), The International Workshop on HIV in Resource Limited Settings(2012, 2014, 2015 $2016). Kambugu serves as a consultant to the World Health Organization on Antiretroviral Therapy since 2010.

Research
He is  cited with an H-Index of 39, i10 index of 120 and with 6598  citations in over 120 peer-reviewed journal in scientific publications. He  is a  Council member for African Centers of Excellence in Bioinformatics.

Some of his most cited articles are listed below;

 Timing of antiretroviral therapy after diagnosis of cryptococcal meningitis
 Outcomes of cryptococcal meningitis in Uganda before and after the availability of highly active antiretroviral therapy
 Retention in care among HIV-infected patients in resource-limited settings: emerging insights and new directions
 Cost-Effectiveness of Serum Cryptococcal Antigen Screening to Prevent Deaths among HIV-Infected Persons with a CD4+ Cell Count ≤100 Cells/μL Who Start HIV Therapy in Resource-Limited Settings
 Clinical features and serum biomarkers in HIV immune reconstitution inflammatory syndrome after cryptococcal meningitis: a prospective cohort study
 Predictors of long-term viral failure among ugandan children and adults treated with antiretroviral therapy
 Paucity of initial cerebrospinal fluid inflammation in cryptococcal meningitis is associated with subsequent immune reconstitution inflammatory syndrome
 Assessment of second-line antiretroviral regimens for HIV therapy in Africa
 Severe renal dysfunction and risk factors associated with renal impairment in HIV-infected adults in Africa initiating antiretroviral therapy
 Tuberculosis immune reconstitution inflammatory syndrome in countries with limited resources
 Cause-specific mortality and the contribution of immune reconstitution inflammatory syndrome in the first 3 years after antiretroviral therapy initiation in an urban African cohort
 Retention in Care and Patient-Reported Reasons for Undocumented Transfer or Stopping Care Among HIV-Infected Patients on Antiretroviral Therapy in Eastern Africa: Application of a Sampling-Based Approach
 Belief in divine healing can be a barrier to antiretroviral therapy adherence in Uganda

Personal life
Kambugu is married to  Joyce Balagadde-Kambugu and they have two  children.

References

External links
Website of Infectious Diseases Institute

Living people
1973 births
Ganda people
Ugandan physicians
Academic staff of Makerere University
People from Central Region, Uganda
Fellows of Uganda National Academy of Sciences
People in public health